Olympic Way, often incorrectly known as Wembley Way, is the road that links Wembley Park tube station and Wembley Stadium in Wembley Park, London, England. Thousands of spectators walk along it to every event as the road leads directly into the stadium. The road is an easy access from the London Underground system at Wembley Park to the stadium, and travels in a north–south direction. The road also allows pedestrians an easy access to London Designer Outlet from the station.

Olympic Way was constructed several years after World War II by German prisoners of war in the United Kingdom. Originally they were intended to be used for picking up refuse during the 1948 Summer Olympics, but their duties were changed due to criticism in the press; one media outlet stated that "It is fair to assume that the Ministry of Labour will think very hard before intending for a slave squad to operate quite so publicly and before quite so many overseas visitors." As a result of a labour shortage, German prisoners of war were used in constructing Olympic War instead.

References

Roads in London
Wembley
Transport in the London Borough of Brent